Hiten Tejwani is an Indian television actor known for his work in several fictional shows.

Personal life

Hiten Tejwani was born into a Sindhi family.

Hiten Tejwani married his Kutumb and Kyunki Saas Bhi Kabhi Bahu Thi co-star Gauri Pradhan on 29 April 2004. The couple became parents to twins, son Nevaan and daughter Katya on 11 November 2009.

In an interview, he revealed that he had been married once before, but went through a painful divorce in 2001.

Career
Tejwani played a role in Ekta Kapoor's serial Ghar Ek Mandir, which was aired on Sony TV. This was followed by appearances in Kapoor's soaps Kabhii Sautan Kabhii Sahelii on Metro Gold, Kaahin Kissii Roz on Star Plus, and Kutumb on Sony TV with Gauri Pradhan. He appeared again with Pradhan in the second season of Kutumb, and Kapoor took the same couple in her show Kyunki Saas Bhi Kabhi Bahu Thi. When Kutumb ended, he was offered the role of Karan Virani in Kapoor's series Kyunki Saas Bhi Kabhi Bahu Thi on Star Plus. In 2009, he and his wife also made a short cameo in the Star Plus show Kumkum – Ek Pyara Sa Bandhan. In 2006, Tejwani along with his wife Gauri participated in the second season of Nach Baliye 2 and returned to host Season 4 in 2008.

He played Anurag Basu in Kasautii Zindagii Kay, replacing Cezanne Khan in the role.

In 2009 and 2010, he also played small or supporting roles in the shows Jasuben Jayantilaal Joshi Ki Joint Family and Kitani Mohabbat Hai on NDTV Imagine, Palampur Express on Sony TV, Chotti Bahu - Sindoor Bin Suhagan on Zee TV and Rang Badalti Odhani on Star One.

In 2011 he appeared in Mukti Bandhan as Vicky Oberoi, where he played the antagonist. Later that year, he was cast again by Kapoor as the lead actor of Pavitra Rishta on Zee TV. Tejwani  was nominated for Best Actor in Lead Role at Zee Rishtey Awards, The Global Indian Film and TV Honours, 5th Boroplus Gold Awards, 11th Indian Telly Awards and 12th Indian Television Academy Awards. He also made a cameo appearance in Kapoor's Kya Huaa Tera Vaada, in the role of Jatin Chopra. He appeared in the Sri Lankan television series Pooja, playing a doctor.

In 2013, he appeared in Sanskaar - Dharohar Apno Ki as Murli. He later played Nitin Joshi in Colors TV's Meri Aashiqui Tum Se Hi. In 2015, Tejwani played the role of Dr. Anant in Balika Vadhu. and also played Niranjan Chaturvedi in Gangaa from 2015 to 2017.

In 2017, Tejwani was a celebrity contestant in the Bigg Boss 11 of the Indian version of the reality TV show Bigg Boss, which premiered on 1 October. He survived for 11 weeks until he got evicted on 17 December (Day 77). In 2018, he appeared in Colors TV's show  Tantra where he plays a role of Inspector Bharat Singh Rathore. In 2019, he portrayed Viraj Roy in &TV's Daayan. As of February 2019, he was a contestant on  Kitchen Champion 5 with his wife Gauri Pradhan Tejwani. Tejwani will play a professor in the upcoming film Nobel Peace.

From 2020 to 2021, he appeared as Shiv Narayan Gupta in Star Bharat's Gupta Brothers. Since July 2022, he joined the cast Colors TV's show Swaran Ghar as Arjun Deol.

Filmography

Films

Television

Web series

Music videos

Awards

References

External links 

 
 

Indian male television actors
Living people
Male actors in Hindi cinema
Sindhi people
Indian male stage actors
Indian television presenters
Indian male film actors
Indian male models
Indian male soap opera actors
Male actors from Mumbai
Bigg Boss (Hindi TV series) contestants
Actors from Mumbai
1974 births